This is a list of foreign players in the Cymru Premier, which commenced play in 1992. The following players must meet both of the following two criteria:

Have played at least one Cymru Premier game. Players who were signed by Cymru Premier clubs, but only played in lower league, cup and/or European games, or did not play in any competitive games at all, are not included.
Are considered foreign, i.e., outside the United Kingdom determined by the following:
A player is considered foreign if his allegiance is not to play for the national teams of England, Scotland, Wales or Northern Ireland.
More specifically,

If a player has been capped at international level, the national team is used; if he has been capped by more than one country, the highest level (or the most recent) team is used. These include British players with dual citizenship.
If a player has not been capped at international level, his country of birth is used, except those who were born abroad from British parents or moved to the United Kingdom at a young age, and those who clearly indicated to have switched his nationality to another nation.
Clubs listed are those for which the player has played at least one Cymru Premier game – and seasons are those in which the player has played at least one Premier League game. Note that seasons, not calendar years, are used. For example, "1992–95" indicates that the player has played in every season from 1992–93 to 1994–95, but not necessarily every calendar year from 1992 to 1995. Therefore, a player should always have a listing under at least two years – for instance, a player making his debut in 2011, during the 2011–12 season, will have '2011–12' after his name. This follows general practice in expressing sporting seasons in the UK.

In bold: players who have played at least one Cymru Premier game in the current season (2020–21), and are still at a club for which they have played. This does not include current players of a Cymru Premier club who have not played a Cymru Premier game in the current season.

Details correct as of 4 February 2021

Antigua and Barbuda 
Nathaniel Jarvis – Barry Town United – 2020–

Angola 
Raúl Correia – Bala Town 2020–2021, Aberystwyth Town 2021-2022

Argentina 
Matias Etchegoyen – Aberystwyth Town – 2020–21

Australia 
Daniel Collins – Bala Town, Rhyl – 2014, 2016–17
 Joe Faux – Cefn Druids 2019–, Caernarfon Town (loan) 2022–

Bangladesh 
Reasat Islam Khaton – Carmarthen Town, Llanelli Town – 2018, 2018–19

Barbados 
Neil Harvey – Cefn Druids – 2015

Brazil 
Rodrigo Branco – Bangor City – 2016–18

British Virgin Islands 
Jordan Johnson – Airbus UK Broughton – 2012–13, 2014–15

Burundi 
Joel Bembo-Leta – Bangor City,  – 2018

Canada 
John Toner – The New Saints, Bala Town – 1999–2009, 2009–10
Simon Rayner – Barry Town United, Port Talbot Town – 2002–03, 2003–04
Cody Ruberto – Cefn Druids – 2019–

Cayman Islands 
Jamie Wood – The New Saints – 2003–11
Anthony Nelson – Llanelli Town – 2018–19

Cyprus 
James Demetriou – Bangor City, Barry Town United – 2017–18, 2018

DR Congo 
Christian Langos – Bangor City, Rhyl, Aberystwyth Town – 2015–17, 2017–18, 2018

Estonia 
Kevin Kauber – The New Saints – 2019

Finland 
Esa Aalto – Cardiff Metropolitan University – 2018–19

France 
Kevin Monteiro – Airbus UK Broughton – 2016–17
Yves Zama – Bangor City – 2018
Moussa Samassa – Cefn Druids – 2018–19 
Papé Diakhité – Cefn Druids – 2019–20
Walid Gharbaoui – Airbus UK Broughton – 2019–20
Louis Malandjou-Kondjo – Bala Town, Caernarfon Town – 2020, 2020–

Germany 
Christoph Azimale – Bangor City, Cefn Druids – 2016–17, 2020–

Greece 
Theodorakis Chrisokhou – Cefn Druids – 2016–17

Gibraltar 
David Artell – Bala Town, Port Talbot Town – 2014–16, 2016

Guinea 
Jacques Kpohomouh – Bangor City – 2016

Guinea-Bissau 
Bruno Fernandes – Cefn Druids – 2014–15
Pavel Vieira – Bangor City, Aberystwyth Town – 2016–17, 2020
Yalany Baio – Bangor City, Llandudno – 2018, 2019
Kalilo Djalo-Embalo – Carmarthen Town – 2020
Edmilson Pedro Vaz – Aberystwyth Town – 2019–20

Italy 
Marco Adaggio – Bangor City – 2007
Filippo Mosetti Casatetto – Cefn Druids – 2017
Jonathan Anderson – Caernarfon Town – 2020

Iran 
Porya Ahmadi – Bangor City, Rhyl, Aberystwyth Town, Newtown – 2015–16, 2016–17, 2018–19, 2019, 2019

Japan 
Hyuga Tanner – Bala Town – 2017–18

Liberia 
Alieu Sheriff – Bangor City – 2017–18

Malta 
Udo Nwoko – Neath – 2012

Montserrat 
Jamie Wood – The New Saints
Dale Lee – Rhyl, Prestatyn Town – 2013–14, 2014

Netherlands 
Alfons Fosu-Mensah – Llandudno – 2017–18
Keurten Martha – Aberystwyth Town – 2020–

New Zealand 
Greg Draper – The New Saints – 2011–21

Nigeria 
Abiodun Baruwa – Barry Town United – 2003
Obi Anoruo – Airbus UK Broughton – 2017
Sergio Uyi – Bangor City – 2017Ismail Yakubu – Pen-y-Bont – 2020–

Pakistan 
Atif Bashir – Haverfordwest County – 2008

Poland  
Bartłomiej Fogler – Port Talbot Town – 2011–12
Krzysztof Nalborski – Aberystwyth Town – 2011–12, 2013–14Adrian Cieślewicz – The New Saints  – 2014–
Arkadiusz Piskorski – Cefn Druids – 2017–2020Wojciech Gajda – Haverfordwest County – 2020–

Portugal 
Namir Queni – Carmarthen Town – 2012–13Paulo Mendes – Aberystwyth Town, Caernarfon Town – 2018–20, 2020–

Republic of Ireland 
David Forde – Barry Town United – 2001–02
Richard Kennedy – Barry Town United, Carmarthen Town – 2001–04, 2005–06
Vinny Whelan – Caernarfon Town – 2007
Richie Partridge – The New Saints, Airbus UK Broughton – 2010–11, 2012–13
Sean Thornton – Aberystwyth Town, Bala Town – 2011–13, 2014
Declan Walker – Bangor City, Aberystwyth Town – 2013–16, 2017–2019
John Disney – Connah's Quay Nomads, Bala Town – 2016–17, 2018, 2018–Tom Holland – The New Saints – 2017–19, 2020–Andrew Burns – Bala Town – 2018–
Kurtis Byrne – The New Saints – 2018–2020Dean Ebbe – The New Saints – 2018–

Romania 
Mihai Leca – The New Saints – 2016

Saint Kitts and Nevis 
Matthew Berkeley – The New Saints – 2009-11Theo Wharton – Barry Town United – 2020–

South Africa 
Paul Evans – Bala Town – 2009–11

Spain 
Guillem Bauza – Port Talbot Town – 2013–14
Anderson Cayola – Bangor City – 2017–18
Carlos Indja – Llanelli Town – 2018–19Lassana Mendes – Bala Town''' – 2019–
Alhagi Touray Sisay – Aberystwyth Town – 2020

Thailand 
Narupon Wild – The New Saints – 2006–08

The Gambia 
Ibou Touray – Rhyl – 2015–16

Trinidad and Tobago 
Vaughn Charles – Bala Town – 2018–19

United States 
Jay Denny – Newtown – 2017–2020

Zimbabwe 
Alec Mudimu – Cefn Druids – 2017–2020
Shama Bako – Aberystwyth Town – 2020

Cymru Premier players
Association football player non-biographical articles